The 1986 Volta a Catalunya was the 66th edition of the Volta a Catalunya cycle race and was held from 9 September to 18 September 1986. The race started in Platja d'Aro and finished in Barcelona. The race was won by Sean Kelly of the Kas team.

General classification

References

1986
Volta
1986 in Spanish road cycling
September 1986 sports events in Europe
1986 Super Prestige Pernod International